This is a list of mummies – corpses whose skin and organs have been preserved intentionally, or incidentally.

This list does not include the following: 
 Bog bodies for which there is a separate list
List of Egyptian mummies (royalty)
List of Egyptian mummies (officials, nobles, and commoners)

See also

List of DNA tested mummies
Buddhist mummies
Incorruptibility

References

Mummies
 
Mummies